Bengt Johansson may refer to:

Bengt Johansson (handball) (1942–2022), Swedish handball player and coach
Bengt Johansson (wrestler) (1926–2008), Swedish wrestler
Bengt-Anders Johansson (born 1951), Swedish politician
Bengt-Arne Johansson (disambiguation)
Bengt-Arne Johansson (officer) (born 1943), Swedish lieutenant-general
Bengt-Arne Johansson (sledge hockey player), Swedish sledge hockey player
Bengt-Gösta Johansson (born 1944), Swedish ice sledge hockey player